Donna Robertson (born 24 April 1969) is a Scottish judoka and wrestler.

Robertson competed in judo at the 1990 Commonwealth Games where she won a bronze medal in the 48kg event.

She also competed in wrestling at the Commonwealth Games where she came 7th in the 51kg event in 2010 and 7th in the 48kg event in 2014.

She is the twin sister of judoka and wrestler Fiona Robertson.

References

1969 births
Living people
Scottish female judoka
Judoka at the 1990 Commonwealth Games
Commonwealth Games medallists in judo
Commonwealth Games bronze medallists for Scotland
Medallists at the 1990 Commonwealth Games
Scottish female professional wrestlers
Wrestlers at the 2010 Commonwealth Games
Wrestlers at the 2014 Commonwealth Games
People from Irvine, North Ayrshire